The d'Orsi Senior Bowl, or Senior Bowl or d'Orsi Bowl, is a biennial world championship contract bridge tournament for national  of "Seniors", players age 60 and older.
It is contested every odd-number year under the auspices of the World Bridge Federation (WBF), alongside the Bermuda Bowl (Open) and Venice Cup (Women). Entries formally represent WBF Zones as well as nations
so it is also known as the "World Zonal Senior Team Championship", one of three "World Zonal Team Championships".
It became an official world championship event in 2001 following a successful exhibition in 2000.

Alternatively, the d'Orsi Senior Bowl is the trophy awarded to the winning team. It was donated at the 2009 tournament in Brazil by former WBF President Ernesto d'Orsi,
and the tournament was renamed at that time.

France won its first title in the 6th Senior Bowl tournament, October 2011 in Veldhoven, Netherlands. USA 2
and Poland placed second and third.

In the 2013 tournament, held in Bali, Indonesia, the original winners were Germany, with USA2 second and Poland third. Two members of the Germany team were later found to be cheating and the WBF awarded USA 2 first, Poland second and France third. The 2015 championship, held in Chennai, India, was won by USA1 ahead of Sweden, with Poland third.

Structure

The zonal quotas and structures are now identical for the Open, Women, and Seniors flights of Zonal Teams, and the three tournaments are concurrent. There are 22 teams —1 from the host country, 6 from Europe, and so on— each four to six players and a captain who may be one of the players.

Teams who draw get 15 points each, up to 25 for the winner and down to 0 for the loser.

The World Transnational Open Teams Championship begins after most teams are eliminated from the three major events; players on all but the four semifinalist teams in each flight are welcome to enter the Transnational.

2000 exhibition

For the 50th anniversary of the Bermuda Bowl in January 2000, the World Teams returned to Bermuda for Bermuda Bowl and Venice Cup tournaments completing the 1998–1999 cycle. A short exhibition for Seniors was added to the program, as was the (third) World Computer Bridge Championships.

Six invited teams contested the exhibition for Seniors: four national teams, one from North America, and "World Champions" comprising one pair each from Austria, Bulgaria, and Israel.
The two Austrians and two Israelis had played on both winners of the (transnational) World Senior Teams Championship, 1994 and 1998, with one of the two Bulgarians as a teammate in 1998.

The six played a double round-robin, ten matches of 20 deals, during the first five days of the main events, followed by two days of playoff matches. Thus all participants were able to enter the Transnational Open Teams contested during the second week of the main events.

Poland defeated France in the 60-deal final by 229 to 73 IMP. France scored slightly better in the first of three sessions but the second and third were routs by Poland.

Standings in the round-robin stage were identical to the final standings. Only Poland and France scored better than average (150 Victory Points, equivalent to ten ties) followed by China, North America, World Champions, and Australia.

In two one-day semifinals Poland beat North America 190–74 and France beat China 145–83,
while World Champions won a fifth-place match against Australia 130–53.
On the final day Poland beat France in 60 deals and China won third place in 40 deals against North America, 133 to 80.

Official world championship flights for Seniors were added to both the quadrennial World Team Olympiad beginning 2000 (ten months later) and to the biennial World Team Championships beginning 2001 (twenty months later).

Results

The first Senior Bowl trophy debuted in 2001 and the eponymous tournament for senior teams joined the official "World Team Championships" program beside the Bermuda Bowl and Venice Cup for open and women teams.
From eight teams in 2001 the field quickly expanded to match the other flights in size with 22 teams each by 2005.

United States teams won the first four Senior Bowls while the other United States team twice finished third. Three Americans in different combinations won three apiece: Roger Bates, Grant Baze, and Garey Hayden. Indonesia has won three medals and European teams have won eight, with England and France winning the last two Bowls.

France won the 2011 d'Orsi Bowl by 165 to 160  in a two-day final match against USA 2,
the second of two qualifiers from the United States.

The Americans started with 6.33 IMP carryover from the 16-deal round-robin match, meaning France must score at least 7 IMP better on the 96 s of the final. France yielded almost nothing during the first three segments, to lead overnight by 89 to 45+ including carryover. The Americans posted a huge fourth set, 79 IMP on 16 deals to regain the lead, but France again yielded almost nothing in the last two segments, and only 75 IMP on 80 deals in the five good segments.

 
The final lead change occurred on the 87th deal (#23) where France played 5 and made it while USA played at a 4 opening bid. France never led by so much as 11 IMP, which is attainable at once, and the final margin less than 5 IMP commonly scored at once. So the outcome "went to the end", even for spectators (who know the score, as players don't).

There were 22 national teams in the field, who represented the eight WBF zones as follows. 
The regular quota for Europe is six teams, seven at Veldhoven because the host country qualifies automatically.
Europe: Poland, Denmark, Italy, France, Germany, Bulgaria, Netherlands —ranks 1 to 6 and 12 in the European championship
North America: Canada, USA 1, USA 2
South America: Argentina, Brazil
Asia & Middle East: India, Pakistan
C. America & Carib.: Guadeloupe
Pacific Asia: China Hong Kong, Indonesia, Japan
South Pacific: Australia, New Zealand
Africa: Egypt, Reunion
The first stage was a full round-robin scheduled in advance.
Every team played 21 short matches of 16(?) deals at three per day.

There was a cheating scandal at the 2013 event. The original winners, Germany, were disqualified, and the WBF moved USA 2 to first place, Poland to second and France to third.

The 2015 championship, held in Chennai, India, was won by USA1 ahead of Sweden, with Poland third ahead of USA2.

Zones and nations
There are eight geographic zones and eight associated zonal bridge federations, all permitted to enter at least one team in the Bermuda Bowl since 199? (Africa). The members of zonal bridge federations are national federations (NBOs) where "nations" are defined by NBO admission to membership in a WBF zonal federation and thus in the WBF. Wales, China Hong Kong, and French Polynesia are bridge nations in Europe, Pacific Asia, and South Pacific, for current examples. 
Zonal membership defines nominal geography: bridge Europe includes Lebanon and Israel, 
and previously included Egypt. Venezuela has represented South America (twice, 1966 and 1967) and Central American and the Caribbean (five or six of seven times, 1985 to 1997).

Zones may be represented only by teams that comprise players from one nation, or national teams in one sense. Further, there may be only one entry from one nation, except that North America is permitted two from the United States in its quota of three. Some zones select representatives by international tournaments which permit only one team from any bridge nation; that is, by competition among national teams in a second sense. 

The European Team Championships are the oldest and largest example, where ranks 1 to 6 subsequently represent Europe in the World Teams. North America does routinely pass on the nominations of two United States teams (selected by the USBF) and selects its third by a two-team "tournament" if Canada and Mexico both choose to enter a national team.

Exceptions
North America, formerly represented by North America teams that were sometimes transnational in composition.
Central America & Caribbean, formerly represented by transnational teams such as Guadeloupe/Martinique. 
Before the Senior Bowl grew to match the size of the Open and Women fields, 22 teams, there were transnational entries from Egypt and South Africa in 2001, Argentina and Brazil in 2003.

See also
 World Team Olympiad
 2021 World Bridge Team Championships

Notes

References

Citations

External links
Senior Bridge program overview at the World Bridge Federation
World Championships program overview at the World Bridge Federation

Contract bridge world competitions